Cristian David Núñez Vázquez (born 12 August 2000) is a Paraguayan professional footballer who plays as an attacking midfielder for Tristán Suárez, on loan from Huracán.

Career
Núñez moved from Paraguay to Argentina in 2015 to join Huracán, though couldn't play matches for their academy for two years due to paperwork issues. Núñez made a breakthrough into first-team football in 2020, with the attacking midfielder making his senior debut on 31 October in a Copa de la Liga Profesional match with Vélez Sarsfield. A day prior, he had signed a new contract lasting until the end of 2023. In June 2022, Núñez was loaned out to Primera Nacional side Tristán Suárez until the end of 2022.

Personal life
Born in Itapé with five brothers, Núñez headed to Villarrica at the age of seven in order to further his footballing career; living with an unrelated man due to his family not having suitable transport to take him to training from his hometown.

Career statistics
.

Notes

References

External links

2000 births
Living people
Paraguayan footballers
Paraguayan expatriate footballers
People from Guairá Department
Association football midfielders
Club Atlético Huracán footballers
CSyD Tristán Suárez footballers
Paraguayan expatriate sportspeople in Argentina
Expatriate footballers in Argentina